Quinta das Conchas station is part of the Yellow Line of the Lisbon Metro, serving the Quinta das Conchas neighbourhood of Lumiar, north east of central Lisbon.

History
It opened on March 27, 2004, in conjunction with the Odivelas, Senhor Roubado, Ameixoeira and Lumiar stations, and it is located on Rua Tóbis Portuguesa .

The architectural design of the station is by Bartolomeu Costa Cabral, Mário Crespo, João Gomes and Anabela João.

Connections

Urban buses

Carris 
 798 Campo Grande (Metro) ⇄ Galinheiras

See also
 List of Lisbon metro stations

References

External links

Yellow Line (Lisbon Metro) stations
Railway stations opened in 2004